Charles Officer (born October 28, 1972) is a Canadian writer, actor, director and former professional hockey player.

Background
The youngest of four children born in Toronto, Ontario to a Black British father and a Jamaican Canadian mother, Officer studied communication design at the Ontario College of Art and Design (OCAD), but left to play professional ice hockey in the U.K.

He abandoned professional hockey due to injury problems and returned to OCAD, before attending the Neighborhood Playhouse in New York City.

Career

Acting 

As an actor, he has appeared in stage, film and television productions, such as the Theatre Calgary/Soulpepper Theatre Company co-production of A Raisin in the Sun. In 2005, Officer starred in the television series Bury the Lead as Russell Tyler, and acted in the television movie Riding the Bus with My Sister, as Xaxier. He has also starred in several short films: Black Tea in Bardo (2015), Overwatch (2012), Furstenau Mysteries (2011), Trouser Accidents (2004), and Urda/Bone (2003).

Directing 
Officer's directorial debut, When Morning Comes, premiered at the 2000 Toronto International Film Festival (TIFF). His other work includes the short films Short Hymn, Silent War (2002), Pop Song and Urda/Bone (2003), a music video for K'naan's "Strugglin'" (2005) and television pilot Hotel Babylon (2005).

He is a frequent collaborator of Canadian filmmaker and actress Ingrid Veninger, having worked on numerous projects with her, including in Urda/Bone, which screened at the New York Film Festival in 2003. The short film was later picked up for distribution by Mongrel Media. Veninger also produced his feature film Nurse.Fighter.Boy.

The 57th Berlin International Film Festival selected his feature screenplay Nurse.Fighter.Boy for its Sparkling Tales writer's lab in 2007. Inspired by Officer's sister's battle with sickle cell anemia, the film was produced while Officer was a student at the Canadian Film Centre. The film was shot over 23 days with a hand-held camera shot on location in Toronto, in areas where Officer grew up, including the back alleyways of Eastern Avenue; Woodbine and Danforth Avenue; and a boxing club in Cabbagetown where Officer had learned to fight at age 13.

Nurse.Fighter.Boy premiered at TIFF 2008 and won the Audience Award at the International Filmfestival Mannheim-Heidelberg and the audience award for Best in World Cinema and a jury prize for Best Cinematography at the Sarasota Film Festival. It was also released theatrically in Canada in February 2009.

In April 2009, production began on Officer's feature documentary about Harry Jerome. The film was completed in 2010.

In 2009 Officer directed two short films for the cross-platform project City Sonic. Officer, along with six other directors, shot 20 short films about Toronto musicians and the places where their musical lives were transformed. Officer directed films starring D-Sisive and Divine Brown.

Premiering at the Vancouver International Film Festival on October 8, 2010, Mighty Jerome explores the rise, fall and redemption of Harry Jerome, Canada's most record-setting track and field star. Archival footage, interviews and recreations are used to tell the story of what Jerome's university coach, Bill Bowerman, called "The greatest comeback in track and field history." Mighty Jerome is produced by the NFB's Selwyn Jacob.

In June 2015, Officer completed principal photography in Toronto on a National Film Board of Canada documentary entitled Unarmed Verses, produced by Lea Marin, which explores youth and race-related issues in the city of Toronto in the aftermath of the killing of Trayvon Martin in the United States through the experiences of Francine, a 12-year-old girl living with her father and grandmother in a northeast Toronto neighbourhood facing demolition and reconstruction. The film was named Best Canadian Feature at the 2017 Hot Docs Canadian International Documentary Festival. In October 2017, it was named Best Canadian Documentary at the Vancouver International Film Festival.

The Skin We're In, Officer's documentary about Canadian journalist Desmond Cole, premiered on CBC Television in March 2017.

In 2018, Officer released the documentary film Invisible Essence: The Little Prince. His next narrative feature film, Akilla's Escape, followed in 2020. Officer and cowriter Wendy Motion Brathwaite won the Canadian Screen Award for Best Original Screenplay at the 9th Canadian Screen Awards in 2021.

In 2022 he won the Canadian Screen Award for Best Direction in a Web Program or Series at the 10th Canadian Screen Awards for "The Death News", an episode of the anthology series 21 Black Futures.

References

External links

Year of birth missing (living people)
Living people
Black Canadian male actors
Black Canadian filmmakers
Canadian male stage actors
Black Canadian ice hockey players
Best Screenplay Genie and Canadian Screen Award winners
Canadian male screenwriters
Film directors from Toronto
Canadian Film Centre alumni
Male actors from Toronto
OCAD University alumni
Ice hockey people from Toronto
Canadian documentary film directors
Canadian people of British descent
Canadian people of Jamaican descent
British Hockey League players
Black Canadian writers
Writers from Toronto
21st-century Canadian screenwriters
21st-century Canadian male writers
21st-century Canadian male actors